The 1977 NAIA Division II football season was the 22nd season of college football sponsored by the NAIA and the eighth season of play of the NAIA's lower division for football.

The season was played from August to November 1977 and culminated in the 1977 NAIA Division II Football National Championship, played on the campus of California Lutheran University in Thousand Oaks, California.

Westminster (PA) defeated Cal Lutheran in the championship game, 17–9, to win their third, and second consecutive, NAIA national title.

Conference changes
 The Texas Intercollegiate Athletic Association began play this season, with five members from Texas. The TIAA would remain an NAIA conference until 1996, after which its remaining membership joined the NCAA Division III American Southwest Conference for the 1997 season.

Conference standings

Conference champions

Postseason

See also
 1977 NAIA Division I football season
 1977 NCAA Division I football season
 1977 NCAA Division II football season
 1977 NCAA Division III football season

References

 
NAIA Football National Championship